The 1955 World Modern Pentathlon Championships were held in Macolin, Switzerland.

Medal summary

Men's events

Medal table

See also
 World Modern Pentathlon Championships

References

 Sport123

World Modern Pentathlon Championship, 1955
World Modern Pentathlon Championship, 1955
Modern pentathlon in Europe
International sports competitions hosted by Switzerland